Planiloricaria cryptodon is the only species of the monotypic genus Planiloricaria, a genus of the family Loricariidae of catfish (order Siluriformes).

This species is native to Bolivia, Brazil and Peru where it occurs in the upper Amazon basin, including the Ucayali, Purus, and Mamoré River drainages. P. cryptodon inhabits sandy substrates in the main streams of large rivers.

P. cryptodon reaches a length of  SL. Although reproductive habits are unknown, this species is probably a lip brooder. Sexual dimorphism is characterized by the shape of the genital area; the genital area in males is elongate and narrow compared with the large and roundish area of females. This species shows derived features such as a reduction in size and number of teeth, premaxillary teeth absent, a circular head shape, and eyes reduced in size without iris operculum.

References

Loricariini
Fish described in 1971
Fish of South America
Fish of Bolivia
Fish of Brazil
Fish of Peru
Fish of the Amazon basin
Taxa named by Isaäc J. H. Isbrücker
Monotypic freshwater fish genera
Catfish genera